Titterington is a surname. Notable people with the surname include:

Desmond Titterington (1928–2002), British racing driver from Northern Ireland
João Titterington Gomes Cravinho (born 1964), Portuguese Minister of Defense (2018-present)
Meredith Titterington (1886–1949), British Labour Party politician
Morris M. Titterington (1891–1928), pioneering aviator, and engineer

See also
Terrington
Tittering
Torington
Wittering (disambiguation)

de:Titterington